Malesherbia linearifolia (vernacular name Blue Star of Cordillera) is a subshrub native to the Coquimbo, Valparaiso, Metropolitana, and O'Higgins regions of Chile. It was the first member of Malesherbia to be described, with the original description dating to 1797 by Cavanilles.

M. linearifolia is phenotypically very similar to sister species M. paniculata; both grow from a rhizome, have cymose inflorescences, and their flowers are range from light blue to deep purple. They differ in their leaves, M. paniculata has pinnate leaves while M. linearifolia has narrow leaves. They also differ in range.   

M. linearifolia is pollinated by Lasia aenea, Centris chilensis, and Centris cineraria.

References 

Rosids of Chile
linearifolia
Taxa named by Jean Louis Marie Poiret
Plants described in 1814